Oliver Golding was the defending champion, but was no longer eligible to compete.

Filip Peliwo won the 2012 title defeating Liam Broady in the final 6–2, 2–6, 7–5, claiming his second consecutive and overall junior grand slam title, having previously won the 2012 Wimbledon Boys' title.

Seeds

Qualifiers

Main draw

Final rounds

Top half

Section 1

Section 2

Bottom half

Section 3

Section 4

References

2012 US Open (tennis)
US Open, 2012 Boys' Singles